Vehicle remarketing is the controlled disposal of fleet and leasing vehicles that have reached the end of their fixed term.

In vehicle leasing, after the lease expires, the lessee either returns the vehicle to the supplier or buys it. The vehicles that are not purchased by the driver become an unwanted asset for the fleet or leasing company because of vehicle depreciation and they look to channel intermediaries to relinquish the stock on their behalf quickly and in high volumes. Remarketing can be done to trade or to consumers.

Key performance indicators

Key performance indicators for vehicle remarketing are the disposal price achieved, usually in reference to a trade guide price (such as CAP Clean in the UK or Black Book in Canada) and the days-to-sell, which is the number of days  between end of lease and disposal of the car. Different remarketing routes targeting different customers are available and offer different options regarding these KPI.

Remarketing to trade

End of lease vehicles that are not purchased by the lessee have traditionally been remarketed through wholesale vehicle auctions such as Manheim Auctions, ADESA Auctions, British Car Auctions or Aston Barclay in the UK. During a car dealer auction, the vehicles are typically sold to car dealerships who in turn will retail them to consumers. In the US, in 2005, 2.7 million fleet vehicles were sold through auctions.  Recently, some of the major fleet owners have chosen to sell the vehicles directly to new and used car dealerships thus bypassing the auction and saving on costs associated with transportation, auction fees and idle time.  The same large fleet owners have taken advantage of digital marketplaces such as Avisdirect.com to offload the vehicles at a lower per unit transaction cost and decreasing the number of days the vehicle sits idle.

Remarketing to drivers and employees

In a company fleet, vehicles nearing their end of lease are made available for purchase to the current driver, and to other employees of the company operating the fleet. The benefits for the fleet and for the leasing company is a reduction in days-to-sell, as vehicles remarketed that way are sold before reaching the end of lease.

References

External links 
 International Automotive Remarketers Alliance (IARA) website

 Avis Direct to Dealer website

Vehicle rental
Used car market